The southern sandfishes are a family, Leptoscopidae, of perciform fishes inhabiting the Indian and Pacific Ocean coastal waters of Australia and New Zealand.

Timeline

References

 
Trachiniformes
Taxa named by Theodore Gill